Antonio Frederick Michael Carlini (born February 23, 2001) is a Canadian soccer player who plays as a midfielder.

Early life
Carlini was born in Ottawa, Ontario, and is of Italian descent. Carlini began his youth career with Nepean Hotspurs SC at age six, later moving to Ottawa South United from U12 until U15. In March 2016, he had a week-long trial with English club Crewe Alexandra. He joined the Toronto FC Academy in 2017, where he was eventually named captain of the academy team.

Career
While with the TFC Academy, he made his debut for Toronto FC II in USL League One in 2019 against South Georgia Tormenta FC. He officially signed a professional contract with Toronto FC II in July 2020. He scored his first goal on July 1, 2021 against South Georgia Tormenta FC in a 2-1 victory. He won USL League One Goal of the Week and Goal of the Month honours for his goal on August 6, 2019 against the Richmond Kickers, also earning Team of the Week honours that week. In 2021, he led the team in game winning goals with three.

International career
In 2016, he was called up to the Canadian U15 national team camp.

Career statistics

Club

References

2001 births
Living people
Canadian soccer players
Association football midfielders
Toronto FC players
Toronto FC II players
USL League One players
Soccer players from Ottawa
Ottawa South United players
MLS Next Pro players